Umebayashi may refer to:

, Japanese composer
Umebayashi Station (梅林駅) is a subway station on the Fukuoka City Subway Nanakuma Line in Japan

Japanese-language surnames